Nationality words link to articles with information on the nation's poetry or literature (for instance, Irish or France).

Events
Henri Beauclair and Gabriel Vicaire, using the pseudonym Adoré Floupette, publish Les Déliquescences d'Adoré Floupette, a parodic collection of poems satirising French symbolism and the Decadent movement.

Works published in English

Canada
 Frederick George Scott, Justin and Other Poems. Published at author's expense.

United Kingdom
 Maude Ashurst Biggs, Master Thaddeus, first English translation of Adam Mickiewicz, Pan Tadeusz (1834)
 Robert Bridges, Eros and Psyche
 Charles Stuart Calverley (died 1884), Literary Remains
 Jean Ingelow, Poems: Third Series (see also Poems 1863, Poems 1880)
 William Morris, Chants for Socialists
 Robert Louis Stevenson, A Child's Garden of Verses
 Algernon Charles Swinburne, Marino Faliero
 Edwin Arnold, The Song Celestial
 Alfred Lord Tennyson, Tiresias, and Other Poems, including "Balin and Balan", one of the Idylls of the King 1870; "The Last Tournament" 1871; Gareth and Lynette 1872, Idylls of the King 1889
 Katharine Tynan, Louise de la Valliere, and Other Poems

United States
 Charles Follen Adams, Mother's Doughnuts
 Thomas Bailey Aldrich, Poems
 Will Carleton, City Ballads
 William Ellery Channing, Eliot
 Ada Langworthy Collier, "Lilith, The Legend of the First Woman" 
 Paul Hamilton Hayne, The Broken Battalions
 Oliver Wendell Holmes:
 Ralph Waldo Emerson, nonfiction
 Illustrated Poems

Other in English
 Toru Dutt, Ancient Ballads and Legends of Hindustan Indian writing in English

Works published in other languages
 Catulle Mendès, Soirs moroses, Contes épiques, Philoméla, etc; Poésies, in seven volumes; France

Awards and honors

Births
Death years link to the corresponding "[year] in poetry" article:
 January 6 – Humbert Wolfe (died 1940), English poet, writer and civil servant
 January 20 – Ozaki Hōsai 尾崎 放哉 pen name of Ozaki Hideo (died 1926), Japanese, late Meiji period and Taishō period poet
 January 25 – Hakushū Kitahara 北原 白秋, pen-name of Kitahara Ryūkichi 北原 隆吉 (died 1942), Japanese, Taishō and Shōwa period tanka poet
 April 21 – Mitsuko Shiga 四賀光子, pen-name of Mitsu Ota (died 1956), Japanese, Taishō and Shōwa period tanka poet, a woman
 April 26 – Dakotsu Iida 飯田 蛇笏, commonly referred to as "Dakotsu", pen names of Takeji Iida 飯田 武治 (died 1962), Japanese, haiku poet; trained under Takahama Kyoshi
 April 29 – Andrew Young (died 1971), Scottish-born poet and clergyman
 May 12 – Saneatsu Mushanokōji 武者小路 実篤 實篤, sometimes known as "Mushakōji Saneatsu"; other pen-names included "Musha" and "Futo-o" (died 1976), Japanese, late Taishō period and Shōwa period novelist, playwright, poet, artist and philosopher
 May 13 – Hideo Nagata 長田秀雄 (died 1949), Japanese, Shōwa period poet, playwright and screenwriter
 July 1 – Dorothea Mackellar (died 1968), Australian poet and fiction writer
 August 18 – Nettie Palmer (died 1964), Australian poet, essayist and Australia's leading literary critic; wife of Vance Palmer
 August 24 – Bokusui Wakayama, 若山 牧水 (died 1928), Japanese "Naturalist" tanka poet
 August 28 – Vance Palmer, (died 1959), Australian novelist, dramatist, essayist and critic; husband of Nettie Palmer
 September 3 – Ghulam AhmadMahjur (died 1952), Indian, Kashmiri-language poet
 September 11 – D. H. Lawrence (died 1930), English fiction writer, poet, playwright, essayist and literary critic
 October 30 – Ezra Pound (died 1972), American poet and editor
 November 9 (October 28 O.S.) – Velimir Khlebnikov (died 1922), Russian Futurist poet and writer
 December 19 – F. S. Flint (died 1960), English poet, translator and prominent member of the Imagist group
 Also
 Govindagraj, also known as "Ram Ganes" Gadkari (died 1919), Indian, Marathi-language poet, playwright and humorist
 Ivan Zorman (died 1957), Slovene-born poet and composer

Deaths
Birth years link to the corresponding "[year] in poetry" article:
 January 10 – Amable Tastu, French women of letters and poet (born 1795)
 May 22 – Victor Hugo, French novelist and poet
 April 8 – Susanna Moodie (born 1803), Canada
 April 30 – Jens Peter Jacobsen (born 1847), Danish novelist and poet
 July 5 – Charles Whitehead (born 1804), English poet, novelist and playwright
 July 15 – Rosalía de Castro (born 1837), Spanish Galician poet and writer
 August 11 – Richard Monckton Milnes, 1st Baron Houghton (born 1809), English man of letters, poet and politician
 August 12 – Helen Hunt Jackson (born 1830), American writer, novelist and poet
 September 24 – George Frederick Cameron (born 1854 in poetry), Canadian poet and journalist

See also

 19th century in poetry
 19th century in literature
 List of years in poetry
 List of years in literature
 Victorian literature
 French literature of the 19th century
 Symbolist poetry
 Poetry

Notes

19th-century poetry
Poetry